Dolichoderus clarki is a species of ant in the genus Dolichoderus. Described by William Morton Wheeler in 1935, the species is found in wet sclerophyll areas of the central coast of New South Wales and the Australian Capital Territory. Workers of this species are known to forage on ground and on low vegetation.

References

Dolichoderus
Hymenoptera of Australia
Insects described in 1935